The Shire of Yarriambiack is a local government area of Victoria, Australia, located in the north-western part of the state. It includes the towns of Hopetoun, Murtoa, Rupanyup and Warracknabeal. It was formed in 1995 from the amalgamation of the Shire of Warracknabeal, Shire of Karkarooc, and parts of the Shire of Dunmunkle and Shire of Wimmera.

The Shire is governed and administered by the Yarriambiack Shire Council; its seat of local government and administrative centre is located at the council headquarters in Warracknabeal, it also has service centres located in Hopetoun and Rupanyup. The Shire is named after Yarriambiack Creek, a geographical feature that meanders through the LGA from the Wimmera River, through Warracknabeal, to Lake Coorong at Hopetoun.

Council

Current composition 
The council is composed of three wards and seven councillors, with three councillors elected to represent the Warracknabeal Ward and two councillors per remaining ward elected to represent each of the other wards.

Administration and governance 

The council meets in the council chambers at the council headquarters in the Warracknabeal Municipal Offices, which is also the location of the council's administrative activities. It also provides customer services at both its administrative centre in Warracknabeal, and its service centres in Hopetoun and Rupanyup.

Townships and localities
The 2021 census, the shire had a population of 6,556 down from 6,674 in the 2016 census

^ - Territory divided with another LGA
* - Not noted in 2016 Census
# - Not noted in 2021 Census

See also 
 List of places on the Victorian Heritage Register in the Shire of Yarriambiack

References

External links 

Yarriambiack Shire Council official website
Metlink local public transport map
Link to Land Victoria interactive maps

Local government areas of Victoria (Australia)
Grampians (region)
 
Wimmera